Agonoize is a German aggrotech band consisting of Mike Johnson (composition, programming, production and mastering), Oliver Senger (composition and programming) and Chris L (lyrics and vocals). The band's 2005 EP, Evil Gets an Upgrade, peaked at #4 on the German Alternative Charts (DAC) and ranked #69 on the DAC Top Singles for 2005. The double CD 999 peaked at #3 on the DAC, ranking #19 on the DAC Top 50 Albums of 2006.

History

Established in late 2002, their first concert was on April 11, 2004.

Discography

 Paranoid Destruction EP (BLC Productions, 2003)
 Assimilation: Chapter One CD (BLC Productions, 2004)
 Open The Gate To Paradise EP (BLC Productions, 2004)
 999 2CD (Out of Line Music, 2005)
 Evil Gets an Upgrade EP (Out of Line Music, 2005)
 Assimilation: Chapter Two (Out of Line Music, 2006) - reissue of 'Assimilation' with bonus CD
 Ultraviolent Six EP (Out of Line Music, 2006)
 Sieben 2CD (Out Of Line Music, 2007) (a 3CD edition was issued titled 'Sieben (Maximum Permissible Dose)
 For The Sick And Disturbed EP (Out of Line Music, 2008)
 Bis Das Blut Gefriert EP (Out of Line Music, 2009)
 Hexakosioihexekontahexa (Out of Line Music, 2009)
 Wahre Liebe (2012)
 Apokalypse EP (2014)
 Apokalypse (2014)
 Midget Vampire Porn (2019)
 Revelation Six Six Sick (2021)

Remixing appearances
2003
Infekktion - Try To Believe
2004
Schattenschlag - Nekromantik
Beta - Darkness (Agonoize Remix)
Dunkelwerk - Die Sechste Armee
2005
Suicide Commando - Menschenfresser
Grendel - Soilbleed
2006
Distorted Reality - Never Change
Dioxyde - Invasive Therapy
2007
Suicide Commando - Hellraiser
2009
Oomph! - Labyrinth (Agonize Remix)
2010
Megaherz - Loblieder - Dein Herz Schlagt (Agonize Remix)
Ashbury Heights - Die By Numbers (Agonoize Remix)

References

German electronic music groups
Electro-industrial music groups
German industrial music groups
2002 establishments in Germany
Musical groups established in 2002
Musical groups from Berlin